Pennfield Ridge is a Canadian unincorporated community in Charlotte County, New Brunswick.

History

 Pennfield Ridge's parish was founded by the Quakers in 1786 and named for William Penn (1644-1718), founder of Pennsylvania.
Pennfield Ridge was the location of RCAF Station Pennfield Ridge.

Communities
The following locations reside within the community boundaries:
Pennfield Station – located in the eastern part of Pennfield Ridge

Transport
Up until October 2012, Route 1 ran through this community. It has been changed to Route 795 with the Route 1 Gateway Project.

Notable people

See also
List of communities in New Brunswick

References

Communities in Charlotte County, New Brunswick